Anat Cohen (born 1975) is a New York City-based jazz clarinetist, saxophonist, and bandleader from Tel Aviv, Israel.

Biography
Cohen began playing clarinet and saxophone. In 1996, she studied at the Berklee College of Music. She has also recorded with her brothers Avishai Cohen (trumpeter) and Yuval Cohen (alto and soprano saxophonist).

Her debut album, Place & Time, featuring Jason Lindner, Ben Street, Jeff Ballard, and Avishai Cohen, was released in 2005 on Anzic Records. Her most recent album as leader, with the Anat Cohen Tentet, was Triple Helix, released in 2019 also on Anzic Records.

Cohen performs regularly and has appeared at a number of notable jazz festivals, including the Newport Jazz Festival, Montreal International Jazz Festival, Tudo É Jazz Festival, and the North Sea Jazz Festival.

Awards
In 2007 she won the awards for "Up and Coming Artist" and "Clarinetist of the Year" from the Jazz Journalists Association. She was also voted "Clarinetist of the Year" every year between 2008 and 2021 and honored as "Multi-Reedist of the Year" in 2012, 2013, 2015,  and 2017 by the Jazz Journalists Association. She has received multiple citations in DownBeat magazine's annual critics' and readers' polls in multiple categories: "Rising Star" in the tenor saxophone (2012), "Rising Star" in the soprano saxophone (2013), and top ranking in the clarinet (2010-2021).

On 12 July 2013, she received the 2013 Paul Acket Award from the North Sea Jazz Festival in Rotterdam from the BNP Foundation.

On 27 November 2017, she was nominated for two Grammy Awards - for Outra Coisa: The Music Of Moacir Santos (with Marcello Goncalves) in the "Best Latin Jazz Album" category and for Rosa Dos Ventos (with Trio Brasileiro) in the "Best World Music Album" category.

She was nominated for a Grammy in 2019 for Triple Helix in the "Best Large Jazz Ensemble Album" category.

Discography

As Leader
Place & Time (2005)
Poetica (2007)
Notes From the Village (2008)
Clarinetwork: Live at the Village Vanguard (2010)
Claroscuro (2012)
Luminosa (2015)

With The Anzic Orchestra
Noir (2007)

With The Choro Ensemble
Choro Ensemble (2005)
Nosso Tempo (2008)

With 3 Cohens
One (2003)
Braid (2007)
Family (2011)
Tightrope (2013)

With Cyro Baptista
Beat the Donkey (Tzadik, 2002)
Infinito (Tzadik, 2009)
Brazilian style
 Alegria Da Casa, with Trio Brasileiro (2016)
 Outra Coisa, with Marcello Gonçalves (2017)
 Rosa Dos Ventos, with Trio Brasileiro (2017)

With The Anat Cohen Tentet
 Happy Song (2017)
 Triple Helix (2019)

With Fred Hersch
 Live In Healdsburg (2018)

References

External links
Official website
Audio Interview with Chet Williamson
Oxford Music Online

1975 births
Living people
Musicians from Tel Aviv
Women jazz saxophonists
Israeli jazz saxophonists
Jazz clarinetists
21st-century saxophonists
21st-century women musicians
21st-century clarinetists